Richard Bruce Nugent (July 2, 1906 – May 27, 1987), aka Richard Bruce and Bruce Nugent, was a gay writer and painter in the Harlem Renaissance. Despite being a part of a group of many gay Harlem artists, Nugent was among only a few who were publicly out. Recognized initially for the few short stories and paintings that were published, Nugent had a long productive career bringing to light the creative process of gay and black culture.

Biography

Early life 
Richard Bruce Nugent was born in Washington, DC, on July 2, 1906, to Richard H. Nugent, Jr. and Pauline Minerva Bruce. He completed his schooling at Dunbar High School in 1920, and moved to New York following his father's death. After revealing to his mother that he decided to devote his life to only making art, she worried about his lack of interest in getting a stable job, so she sent him to Washington, DC, to live with his grandmother. To earn enough money to sustain the family, Nugent would pass as white to earn higher wages. While there, he also experimented with passing, and went by the name Ricardo Nugen di Dosocta, even going as far as giving an address located in the Spanish legation in Washington. In an interview, he claimed he did this for its "convenience" as it allowed him to avoid "bearing the stigma" of being African-American. At that time, he met famous writers including Langston Hughes and Georgia Douglas Johnson. They became friends, influenced each other's works, and collaborated on works together.

Career 
In 1925 his first works as a writer were published. These included his poem "Shadow" and his short story "Sahdji". The majority of his life and career took place in Harlem in New York City, and he died of congestive heart failure on May 27, 1987 in Hoboken, New Jersey.

During his career in Harlem, Nugent lived with writer Wallace Thurman from 1926 to 1928, which led to the publishing of "Smoke, Lilies, and Jade" in Thurman's publication Fire!!. The short story was written in a modernist stream-of-consciousness style. Its subject matter was bisexuality and more specifically interracial male desire. Before committing his life to his art, Bruce Nugent worked several ordinary jobs, including hat seller, delivery boy, and bellhop. During his time as a bellhop he fell deeply in love with a hotel kitchen employee. It is believed that the character of Beauty from "Smoke, Lilies and Jade" is based on this man.

Many of Nugent's illustrations were featured in publications such as Fire!!, along with his short story. Four of his paintings were included in the Harmon Foundation's exhibition of Negro artists, one of the few venues available for black artists in 1931. His only stand-alone publication, Beyond Where the Stars Stood Still, was issued in a limited edition by Warren Marr II in 1945. He married Marr's sister, Grace, on December 5, 1952.

In the late 1930s Nugent worked with other iconic Harlem Renaissance writers, Claude McKay and Ralph Ellison, on the Federal Writers Project. In this project he was employed to write biographical sketches.

Marriage 
His marriage to Grace Marr lasted from 1952 until her suicide in 1969. Due to Nugent's clearly-stated open attraction to other men, his intentions with his marriage to Grace were never clear, as they were not romantic. Thomas Wirth, contemporary and personal friend of Richard Nugent, claimed that Grace loved Richard and was determined to change his sexuality.

Harlem Cultural Council 
Nugent attended the Community Planning Conference at Columbia University in 1964 as an invited speaker. The conference was held under the auspices of the Borough President of Manhattan/Community Planning Board 10 and Columbia University. The idea of forming an organization to promote the arts in Harlem emerged from the conference's Cultural Planning workshop and led to the formation of the Harlem Cultural Council.  During the 1960s, Nugent and other coworkers founded the Harlem Cultural Council, which sought municipal and federal funds for the arts and mainly worked on construction for the Schomburg Center for Research in Black Culture. Nugent also worked as an artist, performer, and commentator. He took an active role in this effort and attended numerous subsequent meetings. He was elected co-chair (a position equivalent to vice president) of this council. He also served as chair of the Program Committee until March 1967.

Dance 
While he was more well known for his writing and illustrations, Nugent also spent many of his years touring as a dancer. He appeared in shows such as Run, Little Chillun (1933) and even toured for two years in a production of Porgy in 1929. In the 1940s, he became a member of the William's Negro Ballet Company. He was also a part of other dance companies, including Hemsley Winfield and Asadata Dafora, even dancing in drag with the New Negro Art Theatre Dance Troupe.

Legacy

Nugent's aggressive and honest approach to homoerotic and interracial desire was not necessarily in the favor of his more discreet homosexual contemporaries. Alain Locke chastised the publication Fire!!! for its radicalism, and specifically Nugent's "Smoke, Lilies and Jade" for promoting the effeminacy and decadence associated with homosexual writers.

Nugent's friends, Langston Hughes, Zora Neale Hurston, Aaron Douglas, Gwendolyn Bennett, and John P. Davis, all frequented "Niggerati Manor", where they socialized with each other and where the origination of "Fire!!!" was based. As well as his friends, Nugent was also influenced by Aaron Douglas and Georgia Douglas Johnson. Their aesthetics were seen in his work. They also helped get his work into various magazines.

Nugent's work resurfaced in anthologies such as Michael J. Smith's Black Men/White Men: A Gay Anthology (1983), and Joseph Beam's interview with Nugent in In The Life: A Black Gay Anthology (1986). His work, after its resurfacing, brought to light the lifestyle of black gay artists during the Harlem Renaissance. His use of codes made much of his work pass unseen by straight contemporaries, under the disguise of biblical imagery, for example. Nugent bridged the gap between the Harlem Renaissance and the black gay movement of the 1980s, and was a great inspiration to many of his contemporaries.

Major works and themes 
Alain LeRoy Locke, an African-American philosopher, educator and writer, asked Richard Bruce Nugent to contribute to his anthology The New Negro. Nugent drew a picture of "a washing drawing of an African girl standing in a hut. The doorway of a hut, apparently jangling her bracelets". Locke liked his picture and suggested that he create a story about it. Therefore, Nugent called the girl "Sahdji". His short story takes place in East Africa and centers on a small tribe in the area of Warpuri. Sahdji is the beautiful wife of Konombju, the chief of the tribe. However, Sahdji's stepson, Mrabo, is in love with her. Therefore, he hopes his father's death will enable him to take his bride. A devoted supporter of Mrabo named, Numbo, becomes aware of Mrabo's desire for Sahdji. As a gesture of Numbo's respect for Mrabo, Numbo kills Konombju during a hunt. The murder appears to be a hunting accident and the tribe mourns the loss through a funeral ceremony. Mrabo triumphantly awaits his new bride, Sahdji; however, the broken-hearted Sahdji mourns her husband's death and throws her body into his funeral pyre while Mrabo watches. This story was initially interpreted as a gay prose text. However, it is now regarded as an African morality tale that condemns murder, not homosexual love. Locke encouraged him to write the story again, and he created Sahdji: An African Ballet. It premiered at Howard University in the late 1920s and was also produced at the Eastman School of Music in Rochester, New York, in the summer of 1932. Nugent's works received honorable mentions.

Bibliography
"Shadow"
"My Love", 1937
"Narcissus"
"Incest"
"Who Asks This Thing?"
"Bastard Song"
"Sahdji"
"Smoke, Lilies and Jade"
"The Now Discordant Song of Bells"
"Slender Length of Beauty"
"Tunic with a Thousand Pleats"
"Pooty Tang"
"Pope Pius the Only"
"On Harlem"
"On Georgette Harvey"
"On Gloria Swanson"
"Lunatique"
"Pattern for Future Dirges"
Paupaulekejo (with Georgia Douglas Johnson)
Tax Fare (with Rose McClendon)

Popular culture

Film
As one of the last survivors of the Harlem Renaissance, Nugent was a sought-after interview subject in his old age, consulted by numerous biographers and writers on both black and gay history. He was interviewed in the 1984 gay documentary Before Stonewall, and his work was featured in Isaac Julien's 1989 film, Looking for Langston.
Brother to Brother is a film written and directed by Rodney Evans and released in 2004. It debuted at the 2004 Sundance Film Festival before playing the gay and lesbian film festival circuit, with a limited theatrical release in late 2004. The film concerns an art student named Perry (Anthony Mackie) who befriends an elderly homeless man named Bruce Nugent (Roger Robinson), who turns out to have been an important figure in the Harlem Renaissance. Through recalling his friendships with other important Harlem Renaissance figures such as Langston Hughes, Aaron Douglas, Wallace Thurman and Zora Neale Hurston, Bruce chronicles some of the challenges he faced as a young, black, gay writer in the 1920s. Perry discovers that the challenges of homophobia and racism he faces in the early 21st century closely parallel Bruce's.

Theater
Smoke Lilies & Jade is a Bildungsroman (coming-of-age) play by writer Carl Hancock Rux.  It is loosely based on Nugent's 1926 short story, "Smoke, Lilies and Jade" (as well as elements of Nugent's own life). The play concerns the psychological and moral growth of its protagonist Alex as he reflects on his love for a man named Beauty (a composite character of all the men the protagonist has loved intimately throughout his life) and a woman named Melva (a character loosely based on Nugent's wife, Grace Elizabeth Marr) as well as the relationships, racial injustices and personal tragedies that befell many of his Jazz Age Harlem compatriots. The play was initially commissioned by the Joseph Papp Public Theater and was later produced by the CalArts Center for New Performance.

References

External links
 The Fire!! Press
 Thomas H. Wirth's Richard Bruce Nugent site
 Bruce Nugent Papers. James Weldon Johnson Collection in the Yale Collection of American Literature, Beinecke Rare Book and Manuscript Library.

1906 births
1987 deaths
20th-century African-American people
20th-century American male writers
20th-century American LGBT people
African-American male writers
African-American poets
African-American short story writers
American gay writers
American male poets
American writers
Harlem Renaissance
LGBT African Americans
PEN Oakland/Josephine Miles Literary Award winners
Writers from Washington, D.C.